Edward Michael Hanlon (1 October 1887 – 15 January 1952) was an Australian politician and soldier, who was Premier of Queensland from 1946 until his death in 1952.

Hanlon was born in Brisbane in the Colony of Queensland to Irish immigrant parents. He lived there throughout his life. After leaving school, he worked in the railways, and soon became a union official. In the 1912 Brisbane General Strike he played a prominent part as a militant. Between 1915 and 1919 Hanlon served in the 9th Battalion, 3rd Brigade, 1st Division of the Australian Imperial Force, whose traditions and battle honours are proudly carried by the modern 9th Battalion, Royal Queensland Regiment. He served under Captain Cec Carroll during the war; in 1934 Hanlon (then Minister for Home Affairs) would appoint Carroll as the Queensland Police Commissioner.

In 1926 Queensland state election, Hanlon was elected to the Queensland Legislative Assembly, representing the Labor Party as member for Ithaca. After two decades and several cabinet portfolios (notably the Health Ministry, where he worked in tandem with doctor and administrator Sir Raphael Cilento), he became Queensland's Premier, once the septuagenarian Frank Cooper had retired. Over the years Hanlon's outlook mellowed, and he shifted to the political right. Having begun as a union militant, he ended up, as Premier, sending the police to suppress union demonstrations during the 1948 Queensland Railway strike.

On 17 June 1951, while in Canberra, Hanlon contracted bronchial pneumonia and spent three weeks in hospital before returning to Queensland on 5 July. On 8 August, Hanlon was admitted to the Mater private hospital and received oxygen. After surviving, doctors warned that Hanlon would be ill for a long period of time. Following this, he took six months' leave of absence from the premiership. In October, it appeared that Hanlon was well enough to leave the hospital. However, suffering another setback, Hanlon remained in hospital until his death in January 1952.

After his death in January 1952, he was succeeded by Vince Gair, the last leader of the state Labor Party administration which had been in power continuously ever since 1932.

Hanlon was accorded a State funeral which took place from St Stephen's Cathedral to the Toowong Cemetery.

Gallery

References

Gregory, Hanlon, Edward Michael (Ned) (1887 - 1952) – Australian Dictionary of Biography

External links

1887 births
1952 deaths
Premiers of Queensland
Deputy Premiers of Queensland
Members of the Queensland Legislative Assembly
Australian people of Irish descent
Politicians from Brisbane
Burials at Toowong Cemetery
Treasurers of Queensland
Australian Labor Party members of the Parliament of Queensland
20th-century Australian politicians